An Eastern Westerner is a 1920 American silent Western comedy film featuring Harold Lloyd. A copy of the film exists.

Plot
The Boy is the hedonistic son of wealthy eastern parents.  One night when he returns home at 2 a.m. from a night of carousing at a dance hall, The Boy's strait-laced father sends him packing to his uncle's ranch in a small western community called Piute Pass.  Upon arriving there, The Boy becomes smitten with a local girl.  She and her father are seeking work from the villainous Tiger Lip Tompkins who owns half the town and terrorizes its people.  He has lecherous plans for The Girl.  When she rejects Tompkins' advances, Tompkins holds The Girl's father hostage in an upstairs room in a local saloon.  The Boy frees The Girl's father and is hotly pursued by a large posse of Tompkins' white-hood clad hirelings who intend to run him out of the state. Using a number of evasive ploys, The Boy eludes the posse and escapes with The Girl.  The film ends with The Boy drawing an engagement ring on The Girl's finger to signify his romantic intentions.

Cast
 Harold Lloyd as The Boy
 Mildred Davis as The Girl
 Noah Young as Tiger Lip Tompkins, The Bully, Leader of the Masked Angels
 James T. Kelley (as Jim Kelley)
 Sammy Brooks
 Mark Jones
 Wallace Howe
 Belle Mitchell as Saloon Girl (uncredited)
 William Gillespie as Dance Hall Manager / Mexican with Knife (uncredited)
 Charles Stevenson as The Headwaiter / Card Player (uncredited)
 Ben Corbett as Rope Twirler (uncredited)

See also
 List of American films of 1920
 Harold Lloyd filmography

References

External links

 

1920 films
1920 comedy films
1920 short films
1920s Western (genre) comedy films
American silent short films
American black-and-white films
American comedy short films
Films directed by Hal Roach
Films with screenplays by H. M. Walker
Surviving American silent films
Silent American Western (genre) comedy films
1920s American films
1920s English-language films